Lotononis is a genus of flowering plants in the family Fabaceae and the tribe Crotalarieae. Almost all of the species in the genus occur in southern Africa.

Species
Several species were recently transferred from Lotononis to four new or restored genera (Euchlora, Ezoloba, Leobordea, and Listia). The species retained in Lotononis are:

 Lotononis acocksii B.-E. van Wyk
 Lotononis acuminata Eckl. & Zeyh.

 Lotononis acutiflora Benth.

 Lotononis affinis Burtt Davy
 Lotononis ambigua Dummer

 Lotononis angustifolia (E. Mey.) Steud.

 Lotononis arenicola De Wild.

 Lotononis argentea Eckl. & Zeyh.
 Lotononis argyrella MacOwan

 Lotononis azurea (Eckl. & Zeyh.) Benth.
 Lotononis azureoides B.-E. van Wyk
 Lotononis bachmanniana Dummer

 Lotononis barberae Dummer
 Lotononis basutica E. Phillips

 Lotononis biflora (Bolus) Dummer

 Lotononis brachyantha Harms

 Lotononis brevicaulis B.-E. van Wyk
 Lotononis brierleyae Baker f.

 Lotononis burchellii Benth.
 Lotononis caerulescens (E. Mey.) B.-E. van Wyk

 Lotononis carinalis Harv.

 Lotononis carnea B.-E. van Wyk
 Lotononis carnosa Benth.
 Lotononis clandestina (E. Mey.) Benth.
 Lotononis comptonii B.-E. van Wyk

 Lotononis crumanina Burch. ex Benth.
 Lotononis curtii Harms
 Lotononis curvicarpa B.-E. van Wyk

 Lotononis dahlgrenii B.-E. van Wyk
 Lotononis debilis Benth.

 Lotononis delicata (Baker f.) Polhill
 Lotononis delicatula De Wild.

 Lotononis dichiloides Sond.

 Lotononis dieterlenii E. Phillips

 Lotononis dissitinodis B.-E. van Wyk

 Lotononis dregeana Dummer
 Lotononis elongata (Thunb.) D. Dietr.

 Lotononis erisemoides (Ficalho & Hiern) Torre

 Lotononis evansiana Burtt Davy
 Lotononis exstipulata L. Bolus
 Lotononis falcata (E. Mey.) Benth.

 Lotononis flava Dummer

 Lotononis fruticoides B.-E. van Wyk

 Lotononis galpinii Dummer

 Lotononis glabra (Thunb.) D.Dietr.

 Lotononis gracilifolia B.-E. van Wyk
 Lotononis gracilis Benth.

 Lotononis humilior Dummer
 Lotononis involucrata (P.J. Bergius) Benth.
 subsp. involucrata (P.J. Bergius) Benth.
 subsp. peduncularis (E. Mey.) B.-E. van Wyk
 Lotononis lamprifolia B.-E. van Wyk

 Lotononis laxa Eckl. & Zeyh.
 Lotononis lenticula (E. Mey.) Benth.

 Lotononis leptoloba Bolus

 Lotononis listii Polhill
 Lotononis listioides Dinter & Harms

 Lotononis lotononoides (Scott-Elliot) B.-E. van Wyk
 
 Lotononis macra Schltr.
 
 Lotononis macrosepala Conrath
 Lotononis maculata Dummer

 
 

 Lotononis maximiliani Schltr. ex De Wild. 
 Lotononis meyeri (C. Presl) B.-E. van Wyk
 Lotononis micrantha (E. Mey.) Benth.
 Lotononis microphylla Harv.
 
 Lotononis minor Dummer & Jenn.
 
 
 Lotononis monophylla Harv.

 
 Lotononis myriantha Baker

 Lotononis neglecta Dummer
 
 Lotononis nutans B.-E. van Wyk
 

 Lotononis ornata Dummer

 Lotononis oxyptera (E. Mey.) Benth.
 Lotononis pachycarpa Dinter ex B.-E. van Wyk 
 Lotononis pallens Benth.
 Lotononis pallidirosea Dinter & Harms
 
 Lotononis parviflora (P.J. Bergius) D. Dietr.
 Lotononis pauciflora Dummer

 
 Lotononis perplexa (E. Mey.) Eckl. & Zeyh.

 

 
 
 Lotononis pottiae Burtt Davy
 
 
 Lotononis prostrata (L.) Benth.
 Lotononis pseudodelicata (Torre) Polhill
 Lotononis pulchella (E. Mey.) B.-E. van Wyk
 
 Lotononis pumila Eckl. & Zeyh.
 Lotononis pungens Eckl. & Zeyh.
 Lotononis purpurascens B.-E. van Wyk
 
 
 Lotononis rabenaviana Dinter & Harms
 Lotononis racemiflora B.-E. van Wyk
 Lotononis rara Dummer
 
 Lotononis rigida (E. Mey.) Benth.
 
 Lotononis rostrata Benth.
 subsp. namaquensis (Bolus) B.-E. van Wyk
 subsp. rostrata Benth.
 Lotononis sabulosa T.M. Salter

 
 Lotononis schwansiana Dinter

 Lotononis sericophylla Benth.
 
 Lotononis serpentinicola Wild

 
 Lotononis sparsiflora (E.Mey.) B.-E. van Wyk 

 
 
 
 
 Lotononis stricta (Eckl. & Zeyh.) B.-E. van Wyk 
 Lotononis strigillosa (Merxm. & A.Schreib.) A.Schreib.
 
 
 
 Lotononis tenella (E.Mey.) Eckl. & Zeyh. 
 Lotononis tenuifolia (Eckl. & Zeyh.) Dummer
 Lotononis tenuipes Burtt Davy
 Lotononis tenuis Baker

 Lotononis trichodes (E. Mey.) B.-E. van Wyk

 Lotononis umbellata (L.) Benth.

 Lotononis varia (E. Mey.) Steud.
 Lotononis versicolor Benth.
 Lotononis viborgioides Benth.
 Lotononis villosa Benth.

 Lotononis woodii Bolus

 Lotononis wyliei J.M. Wood

References

External links

Crotalarieae
Fabaceae genera
Taxonomy articles created by Polbot